Gary Warnecke is an Australian former professional rugby league footballer who played for Eastern Suburbs and Western Suburbs in NSWRL competition during the 1970s and 1980s.

Playing career
Warnecke made his first grade debut for Eastern Suburbs against Penrith in Round 20 1979 at Penrith Park.  The following year, Warnecke became a regular in the Easts side making 16 appearances.  Easts would go on to reach the 1980 NSWRL grand final against Canterbury-Bankstown with Warnecke playing at lock.  Canterbury went into halftime leading 7–4.  In the second half, Canterbury player Greg Brentnall put up a bomb and Canterbury winger Steve Gearin jumped over the top of Easts player David Michael and caught the ball scoring a try in the process.  Easts never recovered from the try and lost the grand final 18–4.  The victory was Canterbury's first premiership in 38 years.  

In 2013, Warnecke spoke of the grand final defeat saying “They keep showing that bloody Steve Gearin try, So it stays in your system and you keep getting reminded about it, it never leaves you, The thing I remember most about that game was it wasn’t one of our best games. It was unfortunate to get to the Grand Final and play so badly. But it’s all done on the day and whoever stands up on the day takes the victory".

In 1981, Eastern Suburbs finished as minor premiers but crashed out of the finals series losing at the preliminary final stage.  Warnecke played in the preliminary final defeat against Newtown.  The following year, Eastern Suburbs again reached the finals but were defeated by reigning premiers Parramatta in the preliminary final 33–0.  

Warnecke played with Easts until the end of the 1984 season where the club finished second last on the table before leaving the club to join Western Suburbs.  Warnecke played 13 games in his one season at Wests as the club finished towards the bottom of the ladder.  Warnecke retired following the conclusion of the 1985 season.

References

1957 births
Living people
Australian rugby league players
Rugby league players from Sydney
Rugby league locks
Rugby league five-eighths
Sydney Roosters players
Western Suburbs Magpies players